Transtillaspis tucumana is a species of moth of the family Tortricidae. It is found in Tucumán Province, Argentina.

The length of the forewings is 8.2 mm for males and 10.5 mm for females. The ground colour of the forewings is brownish with brown strigulation (fine streaks) and darker markings. The hindwings are cream, suffused with greyish brown and darker strigulations.

Etymology
The species name refers to the province of Tucumán, Argentina.

References

Moths described in 2004
Transtillaspis
Moths of South America
Taxa named by Józef Razowski